Rima Michelle Berns-McGown  is a Canadian politician, who was elected to the Legislative Assembly of Ontario in the 2018 provincial election. She represented the riding of Beaches—East York as a member of the Ontario New Democratic Party.  She did not run for reelection in the 2022 provincial election, retiring after a single term in office.  In a statement to the press, she noted:  “Because I am a deeply introverted person, this job takes an enormous toll. For my well-being, I’ve decided not to run for re-election."

Identifying as a person of mixed race ancestry in her piece Purity in Danger, Berns-McGown was part of Ontario's first ever Black Caucus, alongside NDP caucus colleagues Laura Mae Lindo, Faisal Hassan, Jill Andrew and Kevin Yarde.

She is the author of a book called Muslims in the Diaspora: The Somali Communities of London and Toronto.

Election results

References

Ontario New Democratic Party MPPs
21st-century Canadian politicians
21st-century Canadian women politicians
Living people
Women MPPs in Ontario
Politicians from Toronto
Writers from Toronto
Jewish Canadian politicians
South African emigrants to Canada
Jewish Canadian writers
Black Canadian politicians
Year of birth missing (living people)
Jewish women politicians